Sohaila Zaland (Persian:سهیلا زلاند)  is a popular singer of Afghanistan. She is the daughter of singer and composer Ustad Zaland. She is sister of composer Farid Zaland and singers Shahla Zaland and Wahid Zaland.

Personal life
Sohaila is married to an Iranian-American. Her song Waqti Ashiq Shawi (When you fall in love) has been sung by many Iranian singers, notably Hayedeh.  In one of her interviews on Afghan diaspora TV network, she talked about her family's disapproval of her singing. In recent years, she has managed to keep a low profile.

References

Living people
People from Kabul
Afghan Tajik people
Afghan women singers
Persian-language singers
20th-century Afghan women singers
Year of birth missing (living people)
Afghan expatriates in the United States